The Tasmanian Open or Tasmanian Open Championships was a men's and women's international tennis tournament founded in 1893 as the Tasmanian Lawn Tennis Championships. or Tasmanian Championships It was first played Launceston Lawn Tennis Club, Launceston Hobart, Tasmania, Australia. It remained part of the international tennis circuit until 1980.

History
In 1893 Tasmanian Lawn Tennis Championships were established Launceston Lawn Tennis Club, Launceston, Tasmania, Australia. The mens tournament was played on grass courts except for the years 1940, 1941 when it was played on clay courts, and 1971–72, 1974, 1978 and 1980 when it was played on hard courts. The women's tournament was played exclusively on hard asphalt courts outdoors until 1935, then switched to clay courts until 1980. For the years 1940 '48 '51 '55 '60 '64 the tournament was valid as Australian Hard Court Championships. It was an annual featured event on the international tennis circuit till 1980.

In 1994 a new women's event was revived called the Tasmanian International Open, held in Hobart, Australia. Since 2014 it has been known as the Hobart International and still played today.

Location
The championships alternated between Launceston and Hobart, Tasmania, Australia, but was not staged sequentially.

References

Clay court tennis tournaments
Grass court tennis tournaments
Hard court tennis tournaments
Defunct tennis tournaments in Australia